Robert Pendexter "Dexter" "Deck" Shelley (June 4, 1906 – December 17, 1968) was born and raised in San Antonio. He was recruited to play high school football in Dallas for the Terrill School, a forerunner of St. Mark's School of Texas. He went on to become an all conference running back for the University of Texas. During the 1929 edition of the rivalry game between Texas and the University of Oklahoma, Shelley recovered an early fumble on defense and then scored a rushing touchdown to catalyze
the victory.

Professional career
Shelley was a player in the National Football League. He split the 1931 NFL season between the Providence Steam Roller and the Portsmouth Spartans before splitting the following season between the Green Bay Packers and the Chicago Cardinals.

He was a running back on offense and a defensive back and linebacker on defense.

See also
Notable alumni of St. Mark's School of Texas

References

External links

Players of American football from San Antonio
Providence Steam Roller players
Portsmouth Spartans players
Green Bay Packers players
Chicago Cardinals players
Texas Longhorns football players
1906 births
1968 deaths
St. Mark's School (Texas) alumni